Beka II Jaqeli (1332 – 1391) was a Georgian prince (mtavari) and ruler of Samtskhe from 1361 to 1391. He was appointed as Atabeg by his paternal relative, Georgian king Bagrat V. Since 1372 he had ruled Meskheti with his brother Shalva. Shalva died in 1389 and was replaced by his son, Aghbugha I. Beka II's authority in Samtskhe was lost During Timur's invasion of Georgia. After Timur's devastating campaigns Beka II turned away from king Bagrat and surrendered to the enemy. He died in 1391, leaving Atabeg's throne to his son, Ivane, who shared power with Aghbugha until 1395. Jaqeli dynasty lasted from Beka II's descendants.

References

House of Jaqeli
Atabegs of Samtskhe
14th-century people from Georgia (country)
1391 deaths
1332 births